John R. Hirschi Math/Science International Baccalaureate Magnet High School, commonly known as Hirschi High School or HHS, is a four-year public high school in Wichita Falls, Texas, located at 3106 Borton Lane. It is an accredited International Baccalaureate (IB) World School offering the Diploma (IBDP) and Middle Years Program (MYP) to students wishing to pursue advanced academic study in mathematics, science, English, Spanish, French, history, and the arts. Hirschi, an award-winning member of the Magnet Schools of America Association, also offers its students hands-on instruction in aviation, studio/visual art, and nursing. Hirschi has an enrollment of 850 students and is overseen by the Wichita Falls Independent School District (WFISD) and the Texas Education Agency.

History
Recognizing the urgent need for a junior and senior high school in northern Wichita Falls, benefactor and businessman John R. Hirschi turned over the ownership of property to the WFISD; and, in September 1962, John Hirschi Junior-Senior High School opened, under the leadership of Principal A. D. Neal. During its inaugural year, students chose Columbia Blue and Scarlet Red as the official school colors, and the Husky as the school's mascot.

Even though Hirschi never saw the school completed, his daughter, Mrytle Hirschi Ledford, remained committed to the education of Hirschi students until her death in 1994, often awarding scholarships and financial assistance to students.

During the early 1970s, the school enrollment exceeded capacity, forcing the construction of a new building for a separate junior high school. The new Hirschi Junior High School was, for a brief time, called Northwest Junior High, and was later renamed Kirby Junior High in honor of former WFISD Superintendent G.H. Kirby.

The Husky Field House, which also houses the band hall, was constructed for the basketball and volleyball teams during the early 1980s and is unique to the area because of its tartan playing surfaces.

In 1992, Hirschi High School became an official magnet school by adding a strong math/science based curriculum as well as a multimillion-dollar technology lab on the second floor. In 1998, Hirschi became an IB World School and graduated its first diploma and certificate recipients in 2002. Authorized to offer the IB Middle Years Program since February 2002, Hirschi operates the program in conjunction with Kirby Junior High.

In conjunction with Midwestern State University (MSU), Hirschi introduced dual-credit courses, in January 2009, to be taught on campus by an MSU professor.

Hirschi has traditionally had a strong military presence, because of the school's proximity to Sheppard Air Force Base, and consequently having many students whose parents are active or retired military personnel.

Hirschi is the third oldest public high school in Wichita Falls.

Magnet programs

International Baccalaureate Program
Hirschi High School offers to its students an internationally standardized program of study. Since March 2007, Hirschi has been authorized as an IB World School, offering the IB Diploma Program (IBDP) to its juniors and seniors and the IB Middle Years Program (MYP) to its underclassmen. Kirby Junior High School, which offers the MYP to 7th and 8th grade students, partners with Hirschi to facilitate the transition from 8th grade to 9th grade. Students who receive the IB Diploma with all passing test scores are guaranteed a minimum 24 college credit hours at any Texas public university. However, students who do not wish to take all of the courses required for the diploma program can work to obtain IB Certificates in individual subjects. Hirschi students are the only high school students in the Wichita Falls area able to take both International Baccalaureate and Advanced Placement exams at the end of the year. During graduation exercises in May, Hirschi diploma candidates are hooded by the IB Coordinator.

Aviation
Hirschi offers a magnet program in Aviation (the school being located near Sheppard Air Force Base), designed to give students the opportunity to learn principles of aviation and aerospace.

Medical
Sheppard is also a major Air Force medical training facility; thus, Hirschi also offers a magnet program in medicine, which allows interested students to take specified courses that will immediately prepare them for college nursing programs and a successful career in the health care profession. Medical students not only have the opportunity to obtain their Certified Nursing Assistant (CNA) license on campus but also are provided with the opportunity to train and work at local medical facilities such as United Regional Health Care System, the primary hospital in the Wichita Falls metropolitan area. Also, Hirschi students who successfully obtain their CNA license are awarded pins during graduation exercises in May.

Multimedia
Hirschi is home to a multimillion-dollar technology and computer lab located on the second floor of the school's campus. Students in the multimedia program at Hirschi are given the opportunity to produce work in digital graphics, animation, video production, web design, newspaper, yearbook, and professional software. Hirschi IB diploma candidates have the opportunity to choose visual arts as their additional IB course of study. As a testament to the work produced by students in Hirschi’s multimedia program, ten Telly Awards, an award honoring creativity in business commercials and visual productions, have been presented to the school in the past decade.

Student life
Many Hirschi students balance an academic life with the extracurricular activities the school has to offer. Along with traditional student government organizations, students can participate in clubs that are dedicated to academics, community service, technology, music, JROTC, and theater arts. Many students are also able to compete in varsity-level sports such as football, basketball, volleyball, track, soccer, tennis, softball, baseball, and golf.

In the fall, students, teachers, alumni, and fans come together during the Hirschi football season, celebrating decades of tradition by showcasing "Husky pride". The Hirschi Huskies, who share Memorial Stadium with the other two high schools in the district, are usually supported by performances from the Big Blue Band from Huskyland, the Hirschi HiLites dance team, the Hirschi Cheerleaders, and the Hirschi Yell Squad.

In the spring, junior and senior students who demonstrate leadership, a commitment to service, and who maintain a high GPA are inducted in the Myrtle Hirschi Ledford Chapter of the National Honor Society. Also, among other student awards, four students from each class are chosen in the spring to receive the "Pride of Hirschi" award, which is the highest student award that can be bestowed upon a student by his or her peers.

The primary student newspaper for Hirschi is The Husky Howl which is a monthly publication. The annual yearbook is named The Husky.

Hirschi High School is classified as a Class 3A school by the University Interscholastic League and competes with other class 3A schools, both in academic and sporting events, in District 6-3A.

School awards
Magnet Schools of America Merit Award of Excellence: 2001, 2002, 2003, 2005, 2006
Magnet Schools of America School of Distinction: 2004, 2007
Magnet Schools of Texas Merit Award: 1999, 2001, 2002, 2003, 2004, 2005
Telly Video Production Awards: 2002, 2003, 2004, 2005, 2007, 2008, 2010
Videographer Award: 2003, 2004, 2007
Aegis Award: 2003
NASA Aerospace Scholars (3): 2000, 2004

Teachers awards
Texas State Teacher of the Year 2005: Sherry Lindemann (History)
West Foundation Teaching Excellence Award Winner 2006: Carrie Baker (English)
West Foundation Teaching Excellence Award Winner 2005: Elizabeth McBroom (English)
West Foundation Teaching Excellence Award Winner 2002 & 2004: Trevor Wildman (Chemistry)
West Foundation Teaching Excellence Award Winner 2001 & 2004: Sherry Lindemann (History)
Optimist Club Educator of the Year 2005: Christina Hoffmaster (Mathematics)
ACS Outstanding Chemistry Teacher Award 2003 & 2005: Trevor Wildman
Texoma's Best Teacher 2003: Henri Naylor (History)
Lamar Teacher of Excellence 2003: Wayne Calhoon (Spanish)
State Texas Classroom Teachers Association President 2004–2005: Shelby Patrick (Chemistry)

Music awards
"Big Blue Band from Huskyland" - Sweepstakes Award (Superior Rating (1) in both Marching and Concert Seasons): 1973-1974, 1978-1979, 1999-2000, 2000–2001, 2003–2004, 2004–2005, 2005–2006, 2006–2007, and 2007–2008
Hirschi Choir received 1st place at the Music in the Parks Festival in Illinois: Spring of 2007

Athletic awards
Boys' Basketball District Champs 1963, 1970, 1971, 1972, 1982, 1983, 1984, 1985, 1986, 1987, 1988, 1991, 1992, 1999, 2000, 2006, 2009, 2010
Boys' Basketball Bi-District Champs  1983, 1984, 1987, 1988, 2000
Girls' Basketball Regional Playoffs: 2004, 2005, 2006
Boys' Swimming District Champs: 2003, 2004, 2005, 2006
Girls' Swimming District Champs: 2003, 2004
All-State Swimmer 2004, 2005: Jessica Wellington
Softball Borger Tournament Champs and Optimist Tournament Champs: 2005
Girls' Track State Qualifiers: 2007, 2010
Boys' Soccer District, Bi-District, Area Champs: 2015

Number Sense Team
In 2009 and 2010, the Hirschi Number Sense/Calculator team won the University Interscholastic League Class 3A Texas state number sense championship, giving the school both back-to-back team championships and an individual champion (Nathan Shih) in as many years.

2009-2010 accountability rating
Based on the accountability ratings released by the Texas Education Agency in November 2010, Hirschi High School is currently rated "Academically Acceptable."

Notable alumni
 Rodney Reed
 Krishna Reddy

References

External links

Wichita Falls Independent School District Website
Texas Education Agency Website
International Baccalaureate Website
Hirschi Alumni Website

International Baccalaureate schools in Texas
Educational institutions established in 1962
Schools in Wichita County, Texas
High schools in Wichita Falls, Texas
Public high schools in Texas
Magnet schools in Texas
1962 establishments in Texas